is a Japanese politician of the New Komeito Party, a member of the House of Representatives in the Diet (national legislature). A native of Kitakyūshū, Fukuoka and graduate of the University of Kitakyushu he was elected to the House of Representatives for the first time in 1990.  He represents the 2nd District of Fukuoka prefecture.

References

External links 
  in Japanese.

1946 births
Living people
People from Kitakyushu
Members of the House of Representatives (Japan)
New Komeito politicians
21st-century Japanese politicians